The Iowa Aviation Museum is located at the Greenfield Municipal Airport in Greenfield, Iowa, and is dedicated to preserving Iowa's aviation heritage. The Iowa Aviation Hall of Fame, located at the museum, honors Iowans who have contributed significantly to the growth of aviation.

Collection
The Iowa Aviation Museum has eleven civil aircraft on display, including some rare examples of early flying machines from the 1920s, 1930s and 1940s. The museum's collection includes:
1941 de Havilland Tiger Moth, Australian Model
1946 Piper J-3 Cub
1928 Curtiss Robin
1929 Northrop Primary Glider
1937 Piper J-2
1941 de Havilland Tiger Moth, Canadian Model
1941 Aetna-Timm Aero craft
1946 Taylorcraft, BC12
1957 Schweizer 1-20
1932 Mead Primary Glider
1968 Pitts Special S1S
1975 Easy Riser Glider
A-7D Corsair II
AH-1 Huey Cobra Gunship
1929 Pietenpol Replica
1931 Kari Keen
1929 Stearman
1963 Cherokee II Sailplane

Iowa Aviation Hall of Fame
The Iowa Aviation Hall of Fame began in 1990 and preceded the opening of the Iowa Aviation Museum. According to the museum's website, "Nominations to the Hall of Fame are accepted until February 1st of each year. A selection committee, appointed by the Museum's Board of Directors, evaluates the nominations on a point system. A permanent tribute for each Hall of Fame inductee is featured at the Museum. The Museum is the only place in Iowa which focuses on the state's aviation heritage."

Iowa Aviation Hall Of Fame Inductees By Year
1990
Ann Holtgren Pellegreno: First woman to serve as a Commissioner for both the Iowa Aeronautics Commission and the Iowa Department of Transportation.
John and Yvonne Schildberg: John's fascination with vintage aircraft and Yvonne's generosity resulted in the presentation of ten antique aircraft to the Greenfield community which was the foundation of the Iowa Aviation Museum.
John Wesley Cable: Constructed the first airport in Waterloo, Iowa in 1927.
William "Billy" Robinson
Wyman Fiske Marshall: A member of the “Three Musketeers,” the first aerobatic flying team in the United States, from 1928-1929 and United States Marine Corps Brigadier General.
1991
Aden "Bite" Livingston
Arthur J. Hartman
Don Ultang
Ila Fox Loetscher
1992
Charles A. Horner
Neta Snook Southern: Taught Amelia Earhart how to fly.
Sidney "Sid" Cleveland
1993
Clarence Duncan Chamberlin
Clayton Folkerts
Louis "Andy" Anderson
Nellie Vos Ruby
1994
Eugene Burton Ely
JC Pemberton
Luther H. Smith
Robert L. Taylor
1995
John Livingston
Ralph E. Piper
Robert Freyermuth
1996
Carl G. Zeliadt
Grant H. Woldum
Howard V. Gregory
1997
Charles W. Fink
Donald A. Luscombe
Herbert R. Elliott
William Norman Reed
1998
Avery "Jack" Ladd
Elvin F. Knotts
Robert W. Williams
1999
Charles Gatschet
Clifton P. "Ole" Oleson
Harold B. Miller
2000
Hartley A. "Hap" Westbrook
2001
Ralph Weberg
Robert Parmele
Russell and Dolly Zangger
2002
Carl Bates
Glenn L. Martin
2003
Louis Schalk
Walter Cunningham
Wilbur and Orville Wright
2004
Ellen Church Marshall
Joseph P. Gomer
2005
H. Jerry Dwyer
2006
 The Iowa Tuskegee Airmen: William V. Bibb, James E. Bowman, Russell L. Collins, Maurice V. Esters, Joseph P. Gomer, Robert L. Martin, George R. Miller, Clarence A. Oliphant, Robert M. Parkey, Luther H. Smith, Thurman E. Spriggs, and Robert W. Williams.
2007
Frank C. Wallace
Wilmer A. Reedholm
2008
Kimberly D. Olson
William J. Fox
2009
Delbert H. Clayton
Jack E. Conger
2010
Clyde Cable
Glen Niederhauser

See also

 North American aviation halls of fame
 List of aerospace museums

References

Aerospace museums in Iowa
Museums in Adair County, Iowa
Greenfield, Iowa
Museums established in 1990